WSIP may refer to:

 WSIP (AM), a radio station (1490 AM) licensed to Paintsville, Kentucky, United States
 WSIP-FM, a radio station (98.9 FM) licensed to Paintsville, Kentucky, United States
 Western Sydney Infrastructure Plan, a road investment program in Western Sydney, New South Wales, Australia
 Wydawnictwa Szkolne i Pedagogiczne, a Polish book publisher